The 2013 Mumbai building collapse occurred on 27 September 2013 when a five-story building collapsed in the Mazagaon area of Mumbai city in Maharashtra a state in India. At least 61 people died and 32 others were injured in the disaster.

Collapse 
The building, which collapsed at 6a.m. IST on 27 September 2013, had more than 100 residents. Police said that the collapse occurred after a mezzanine floor was built without permission in an office-warehouse on the ground floor of the building. The 32-year-old building was owned by the Brihanmumbai Municipal Corporation. Three officials in its civic markets department were arrested for not acting on reports that the building was unsound after the renovation works.

See also 
 2013 Thane building collapse

References

Building collapses in 2013
Building collapses in India
2013 disasters in India
2013
September 2013 events in India
Disasters in Maharashtra
2013